The South Suburban Conference is a Minnesota State High School League conference in Minnesota.  It was started officially on July 1, 2010, when 9 schools from the Lake Conference and one from the Missota Conference left their respective conferences to create the South Suburban. They offer 30 different interscholastic sports and 14 fine arts activities. After the 2013-14 school year, Bloomington Jefferson and Bloomington Kennedy left the conference to the newly formed Metro West Conference for a better balance of enrollment. Farmington Senior High School and Shakopee High School joined from the Missota Conference that same year.

Member schools
Apple Valley
Burnsville
Eagan
Eastview
Farmington
Lakeville North
Lakeville South
Prior Lake
Rosemount
Shakopee

References

Minnesota high school sports conferences
High school sports conferences and leagues in the United States